St Luke's Football Club is a Northern Irish, intermediate football club playing in Division 1B of the Northern Amateur Football League. The club is based in Twinbrook, Belfast, and was formed in 1974. The team plays in the Irish Cup.

References

External links
  Club website]

Association football clubs in Northern Ireland
Association football clubs established in 1974
Association football clubs in Belfast
Northern Amateur Football League clubs
1974 establishments in Northern Ireland